7th Critics' Choice Documentary Awards, presented by the Critics Choice Association, was held on November 13, 2022, at the Edison Ballroom in New York City, to honor finest achievements in documentary filmmaking and non-fiction television. The ceremony was hosted by Wyatt Cenac and was broadcast on Facebook Live and Instagram Live.

The nominees were announced on October 17, 2022, with Fire of Love leading the nominations with seven, followed by Good Night Oppy with six. American documentary film director Barbara Kopple received the Pennebaker Award.

Notes
The categories for Best Ongoing Documentary Series and Best Limited Documentary Series were moved from the Critics' Choice Real TV Awards back to the Critics' Choice Documentary Awards, both categories used to be awarded in the latter until 2018.

Winners and nominees
The nominations were announced on October 17, 2022. Winners are listed first and in bold.

Pennebaker Award
Barbara Kopple

Films with multiple wins and nominations

References

External links
Official website

Critics' Choice Documentary Awards
Critics' Choice Documentary Awards